Tahuanía District is one of the four districts of the province Atalaya in Peru.

The district was created by Law No. 9815 of 2 July 1943, during the government of President Manuel Prado Ugarteche.

In this district of the Peruvian Amazon lives the ethnic Pano group Shipibo-Conibo self-named Joni.

References

Districts of the Atalaya Province
Districts of the Ucayali Region